Nassau Street may refer to:

Nassau Street, Dublin, Ireland
Nassau Street (Manhattan), New York City, US
Nassau Street (Princeton, New Jersey), US
Nassau Street (Winnipeg), Manitoba, Canada

See also
 Nassau Avenue (IND Crosstown Line), New York subway station
Nassau (disambiguation)